STX Europe AS, formerly Aker Yards ASA, was until 2012 a subsidiary of the South Korean STX Offshore & Shipbuilding.

With headquarters in Oslo, Norway, STX Europe operated 15 shipyards in Brazil, Finland, France, Norway, Romania and Vietnam.  The company had three business areas: Cruise & Ferries, Offshore & Specialized Vessels and Other Operations.

In 2012, with rising outstanding debts, STX retained the Finnish cruise shipbuilding yard and sold the remainder as STX OSV Holdings, (Offshore & Specialist Vessels), including all the yards, to Fincantieri, which renamed the group Vard.

In September 2014 STX Finland was sold, 70% to Meyer Werft and 30% to the Finnish government. The operations were continued under name Meyer Turku thereafter. Meyer Werft acquired the Finnish government's 30% in April 2015.

In 2017 STX France, after the bankruptcy of STX Corporation, was acquired by the French government and reverted to its original name of Chantiers de l'Atlantique.

History

Background: before 2006
The evolution of STX Europe originated with the founding of two prominent shipbuilding groups in Europe. One was the Norway-based Aker Yards, created in 2004 by combining the shipbuilding activities of Aker and Kværner with the France-based Alstom shipbuilding group, which has shipyards (formerly those of  Chantiers de l'Atlantique in Saint-Nazaire) and in Lorient.

Transition to STX Europe, and expansion: 2006–2012
On 4 January 2006, Aker Yards and Alstom announced their intention to join forces in shipbuilding and create together one of the world leaders in this industry, focused on high-value-added ships, including world-class cruise ships. The merger gave Aker Yards a majority shareholding over Alstom's shipbuilding activities; which included Chantiers de l'Atlantique shipyard – the builder of the liner .

Aker ASA, the  majority shareholder of Aker Yards; reduced its ownership share from 50.4% to 40.1% in January 2007. Aker divested its total shareholding in March 2007, and in October 2007, STX Business Group secured a 39.2% stake of Aker yards. Later, STX took a controlling stake, and renamed the group to STX Europe on 3 November 2008 to reflect the new ownership structure.

In January 2009, STX business group acquired the remaining shares in STX Europe and became the company's sole shareholder.  In February 2009, it was decided to delist STX Europe from Oslo Stock Exchange where it was previously listed under the ticker STXEUR.

Operations

Cruise & Ferries
The Cruise & Ferries division constructs vessels mainly at shipyards in Finland and France. The business area had revenues of NOK 19,709 million in 2008.

List of shipyards

Cruise + Ferry 

  STX France Cruise SA (located at St. Nazaire and Lorient)

Other Operations 

  STX Norway Florø AS (located in Florø)

OSV (OffShore & Specialized Vessels) 

  STX Norway Offshore AS (located at Ålesund, Aukra, Brevik, Langsten (Langsten Slip-Batbyggeri AS), Brattvåg, Florø and Søviknes) is now owned by Fincantieri
  STX OSV Tulcea SA and STX OSV Braila SA
STX Europe has two shipyards in Romania: Braila and Tulcea. The steel hulls for most of STX Europe's new building projects (Offshore & Specialized Vessels) are being built by Braila and Tulcea in Romania.  STX Europe's yard in Braila is situated  170 km up the River Danube. Portfolios consist of hull production, delivery of complete merchant vessels together with repair and conversion work.  The yard has a 1300m long outfitting quay, facilities for simultaneous mounting or repairing of 12 vessels and equipped with multiple 50 tonne portal cranes. The mounting platform and launching berth have capacity for vessels up to 135 x 23 m and a maximum launching and lifting weight of 2500 tonne and 2200 tonne respectively.

STX Europe's yard in Tulcea is located at nautical mile 39.5 on the right bank of the Danube, upstream of Tulcea, and it is one of the youngest Romanian firms in the field. In Tulcea STX Europe offers services in shipbuilding, conversions and repairs. It has a large covered hall where four ships can be built simultaneously. Over 6000 people working here, it is the greater capacity of offshore and specialised division.

  STX OSV Niteroi SA
  STX OSV Vietnam Ltd.

Production

Ships 

STX Europe :

 Adventure of the Seas, in 2001 for Royal Caribbean Cruise Line
 Allure of the Seas, in 2010 for Royal Caribbean Cruise Line
 Carnival Legend, in 2002 for Carnival Cruise Lines
 Carnival Miracle, in 2004 for Carnival Cruise Lines
 Carnival Pride, in 2001 for Carnival Cruise Lines
 Carnival Spirit, in 2001 for Carnival Cruise Lines
 Coral Princess, in 2001 for Princess Cruises
 Costa Atlantica, in 2000 for Costa Cruises
 Costa Mediterranea, in 2003 for Costa Cruises
 Explorer of the Seas, in 2000 for Royal Caribbean Cruise Line
 Freedom of the Seas, in 2006 for Royal Caribbean Cruise Line
 Independence of the Seas, in 2008 for Royal Caribbean Cruise Line
 , in 2003 for Princess Cruises
 Liberty of the Seas, in 2007 for Royal Caribbean Cruise Line
 Majesty of the Seas, in 1992 for Royal Caribbean Cruise Line
 Mariner of the Seas, in 2003 for Royal Caribbean Cruise Line
 Monarch of the Seas, in 1991 for Royal Caribbean Cruise Line
 MSC Divina, in 2012 for MSC Cruises
 MSC Fantasia, in 2008 for MSC Cruises
 MSC Lirica, in 2003 for MSC Cruises
 MSC Magnifica, in 2010 for MSC Cruises
 MSC Musica, in 2006 for MSC Cruises
 MSC Opera, 2004 for MSC Cruises
 MSC Orchestra, in 2007 for MSC Cruises
 MSC Poesia, in 2008 for MSC Cruises
 MSC Preziosa, in 2013 for MSC Cruises
 MSC Splendida, in 2009 for MSC Cruises
 Navigator of the Seas, in 2002 for Royal Caribbean Cruise Line
 Oasis of the Seas, in 2009 for Royal Caribbean Cruise Line
 Queen Mary 2, in 2003 for Cunard Line
 R One, in 1998 for Renaissance Cruises (since 2004 Insignia (Oceania Cruises))
 R Two, in 1998 for Renaissance Cruises (since 2003 Regatta (Oceania Cruises))
 R Three, in 1999 for Renaissance Cruises (since 2002 Pacific Princess (Princess Cruises))
 R Four, in 1999 for Renaissance Cruises (since 2002 Ocean Princess (Princess Cruises))
 R Five, in 1998 for Renaissance Cruises (since 2005 Nautica (Oceania Cruises))
 R Six, in 2000 for Renaissance Cruises (since 2007 Azamara Journey (Azamara Club Cruises))
 R Seven, in 2000 for Renaissance Cruises (since 2007 Azamara Quest (Azamara Club Cruises))
 R Eight, in 2001 for Renaissance Cruises (since 2007 Royal Princess (Princess Cruises))
 Rhapsody of the Seas, in 1999 for Royal Caribbean Cruise Line
 Vision of the Seas, in 1998 for Royal Caribbean Cruise Line
 Voyager of the Seas, in 1999 for Royal Caribbean Cruise Line
 Armorique, in 2009 for Brittany Ferries
 Aurora af Helsingborg, in 1992 for Scandlines
 Baltic Princess, in 2006 for Tallink
 Birka Paradise, in 2004 for Birka Line
 Color Fantasy, in 2004 for Color Line
 Color Magic, in 2007 for Color Line
 Celebrity Constellation, in 2002 for Celebrity Cruises
 Aeolos Express, (HSC) in 2000 for NEL Lines (since 2007 Aeolos Kenteris I)
 Aeolos Express II, (HSC) in 2001 for NEL Lines (since 2007 Aeolos Kenteris II)
 Aeolos Kenteris, (HSC) in 2001 for NEL Lines
 Cotentin, in 2007 for Brittany Ferries
 Crystal Serenity, in 2003 for Crystal Cruises
 Destination Gotland, in 1999 for Destination Gotland
 Dreamward, in 1992 for Norwegian Cruise Line
 Dryna, in 2005 for Fjord1
 European Stars, in 2002 for Festival Cruises (since 2005 MSC Sinfonia (MSC Cruises))
 European Vision, in 2001 for Festival Cruises (since 2004 MSC Armonia (MSC Cruises))
 Galaxy, in 2006 for Tallink
 Glutra, in 2000 for MRF
 Hamlet, in 1997 for Scandlines
 Hamnavoe, in 2002 for NorthLink Ferries
 Haroy, in 2006
 , in 2001 for NorthLink
 , in 2001 for NorthLink
 Île de Groix, in 2008 for the Morbihan département
 Impératrice Eugénie, in 1865
 Celebrity Infinity, in 2001 for Celebrity Cruises
 Julsund, in 2004 for Fjord1
 Kalliste, in 1993 for Compagnie méridionale de navigation
 Le Levant, in 1999 for Compagnie du Ponant
 Celebrity Millennium, in 2000 for Celebrity Cruises
 Mistral, in 1999 for Festival Cruises (since 2005 Grand Mistral (Iberocruceros))
 Napoléon Bonaparte, in 1996  for SNCM
 Nils Dacke, in 1994 for TT-Lines
 Nordic Empress, in 1990 for Royal Caribbean Cruise Lines
 Paul Gauguin, in 1997 for Radisson Seven Seas Cruises
 Polonia, in 1995 for Unity Lines
 Radisson Diamond (SWATH) in 1992 for Radisson Seven Seas Cruises (since 2005 Asia Star)
 Romantika, in 2002, for Tallink
 SeaFrance Rodin, in 2001 for SeaFrance
 SeaFrance Berlioz, in 2005 for SeaFrance
 , in 2010 for P&O Ferries
 , in 2011 for P&O Ferries
 Star, in 2007 for Tallink
 Stena Explorer, (HSC) in 1996 for Stena Line
 Celebrity Summit, in 2001 for Celebrity Cruises
 Superspeed 1, in 2008 for Color Line
 Superspeed 2, in 2008 for Color Line
 Tidedronningen, in 2009 for Tide Sjo AS
 Tidekongen, in 2009 for Tide Sjo AS
 Tideprinsen, in 2009 for Tide Sjo AS
 Tycho Brahe, in 1991 for DSB Rederi
 Ulysses, in 2001 for Irish Ferries
 Victoria 1, in 2004 for Tallink
 Viking Surkov, in 1984 (since 2008 Viking Helgi for Viking River Cruises)
 Viking XPRS, in 2008 for Viking Line
 Windward, in 1993 for Norwegian Cruise Line
 ADV Ocean Shield, as OSV Skandi Bergen

References

Shipbuilding companies of Norway
Engineering companies of Norway
Companies based in Oslo
Norwegian companies established in 2004
Manufacturing companies established in 2004
Fincantieri